The Brussels buses network is complementary to the rail network in Brussels, Belgium, which consists of trams, trains, and metro trains. Brussels buses are operated by STIB/MIVB, the local public transport company. It has 50 bus routes and 11 night routes, which run on Friday and Saturday night.

Some buses from Flemish transport company De Lijn and Walloon transport company TEC also serve Brussels but are not part of the same bus system.

History
The first motor buses were used in Brussels in 1907, with one route connecting the Brussels Stock Exchange to the Ixelles town hall. It was then stopped in 1913. Other buses were set in service from 1920 on, and in 1926 Les Autobus Bruxellois, a bus company, was founded to operate the bus network. In 1955, one year after the STIB was founded, it took over Les Autobus Bruxellois and operated the bus network, made of 3 bus routes and 1 trolleybus route. The STIB expanded the network and in 1964, it was 185 km long. The rolling stock was renewed in 1972 and in 1991, with a new yellow livery. In 2003, the STIB tested its first night bus route named N71

Current bus routes
Valid on 8 March 2022.

References

External links

STIB/MIVB official website